Larry Bryggman (born December 21, 1938) is an American actor. He is known for Spy Game (2001), Die Hard: With a Vengeance (1995) and As the World Turns (1956). He appeared as George Helms, a past Medical Director, on the show New Amsterdam (2022) on Netflix.

Early life
Bryggman was born in Concord, California on December 21, 1938 of Swedish descent; his father worked for a neon sign company and his mother was a piano teacher. Bryggman attended the City College of San Francisco as well as the American Theatre Wing in New York City. He made his off-Broadway debut in 1962, with A Summer Ghost.

Career
Bryggman is known for his role as Dr. John Dixon in the soap opera As the World Turns (ATWT), a role he played from July 18, 1969, to December 14, 2004. Originally the role was a minor background part, which only required Bryggman to work two episodes, but he was later hired to a contract in 1970. For his role as Dr. Dixon, Bryggman received two Daytime Emmy Awards for Outstanding Actor in a Drama, in 1984 and 1987.

He has also made several notable appearances in major films, most notably ...And Justice for All, Die Hard with a Vengeance and Spy Game.

In December 2004, Bryggman's picture suddenly stopped appearing in the opening credits of As the World Turns. Although many actors were rarely seen on the show, ATWT had a history of keeping its veteran actors under contract. After a few weeks of not appearing in the opening credits, it was revealed that Bryggman decided to quit after being offered a large pay cut. Though no onscreen attempt was made to explain the character's absence—his character simply stopped appearing—vintage clips of Bryggman were featured in ATWTs fiftieth anniversary show in April 2006. Beginning on August 27, 2010, Bryggman returned to ATWT for 12 of the final 16 episodes, as the show finished its run on September 17, 2010. For these final episodes of the series, it was explained that Dixon had been working at Johns Hopkins for an undisclosed period of time, but had been asked by Dr. Reid Oliver to return to Oakdale Memorial to consult on the ailing Christopher Hughes.

In 2005, Bryggman starred as the Judge in the Atlantic Theater Company's off-Broadway and Los Angeles productions of the David Mamet farce Romance, for which he received universal rave reviews and a nomination for the 2005 Drama Desk Award for Outstanding Featured Actor in a Play. James C. Taylor of the Los Angeles Times called Bryggman's performance "one of the finest comedic performances seen on an American stage this decade".

Bryggman has twice been nominated for the Tony Award for Best Featured Actor in a Play; in 1994 for Picnic, and in 2001 for Proof. He also appeared in the original 1976 Broadway cast of Checking Out.

Personal life
Bryggman married his As the World Turns co-star, Jacqueline Schultz, in 1992. In two separate relationships, he had three children: sons Jeffrey and Michael and daughter Heidi. Michael died in 1993. He married Tracey Hanley Bryggman, an assistant director on Guiding Light when their son Ryan was born; they had their second child, daughter Riley, in 2003.''

Partial filmography

References

External links

SoapCentral actors page

1938 births
Living people
American people of Swedish descent
American male stage actors
American male film actors
American male television actors
American male soap opera actors
Daytime Emmy Award winners
Daytime Emmy Award for Outstanding Lead Actor in a Drama Series winners
Male actors from California